Laura Macchi (born May 24, 1979) is an Italian professional basketball player who played for the Los Angeles Sparks of the WNBA.

WNBA stats

References

1979 births
Living people
Power forwards (basketball)
Italian women's basketball players
Los Angeles Sparks players
Italian expatriate basketball people in the United States
Sportspeople from Varese